The Bean eater (Italian: Mangiafagioli) is a painting by the Italian Baroque painter Annibale Carracci. Dating from 1580–1590 (probably 1583–1584), it is housed in the gallery of Palazzo Colonna of Rome.

The painting is connected to the contemporary Butcher's Shop (now at Oxford), for it shares the same popular style. Painted in Bologna, it is a broadly and realistically painted still life, which owes much to Flanders and Holland.

Carracci was also influenced in the depiction of everyday life subjects by Vincenzo Campi and Bartolomeo Passarotti. Manifest is Carracci's capability to adapt his style, making it "lower" when concerning "lower" subjects like the Mangiafagioli, while in his more academic works (such as the broadly contemporary Assumption of the Virgin) he was able to use a more classicist composure with the same ease.

References

Elsewhere
Page at artonline.it 

1580s paintings
Paintings by Annibale Carracci
Food and drink paintings